Esat may refer to:

 Esat Bicurri (1948–1999), Albanian-Kosovar pop singer
 Hilmi Esat Bayındırlı (born 1962), Turkish-American para-skier
 Mahmut Esat Bozkurt  (1892–1943), Turkish jurist, politician, government minister and academic
 Mehmet Esat Bülkat (1862–1952), Ottoman Army general and government minister